Thunder Cross may refer to:

 Thunder Cross, the swastika in Latvian contexts
 Pērkonkrusts, a Latvian fascist organisation led by Gustavs Celmiņš, sometimes referred to in English as the Thunder Cross
 Thunder Cross (arcade game), a 1988 scrolling shoot 'em up arcade game
 Rhapsody of Fire, formerly Thundercross, an Italian power metal band